Benny Hickey (born 1978) is an Irish Gaelic footballer who played as a centre-forward for the Tipperary senior team.

Born in Cahir, County Tipperary, Hickey first arrived on the inter-county scene at the age of twenty when he first linked up with the Tipperary under-21 team before later joining the junior side. He joined the senior football panel during the 2002 championship. Hickey subsequently became a regular member of the starting fifteen and won one Tommy Murphy Cup medal.

At club level Hickey is a one-time championship medallist with Cahir.

Hickey retired from inter-county football following the conclusion of the 2006 championship.

Honours

Player

Cahir
Tipperary Senior Football Championship (1): 2003

Tipperary
Tommy Murphy Cup (1): 2005
McGrath Cup (1): 2003

References

1978 births
Living people
Cahir Gaelic footballers
Tipperary inter-county Gaelic footballers